Belle Ayr Mountain is a mountain in the Catskill Mountains of New York southwest of Pine Hill. Fleischmann Mountain is to the west-northwest, Brush Ridge is north, Balsam Mountain and Haynes Mountain are south of Bell Ayr Mountain.

References

Mountains of Ulster County, New York
Mountains of New York (state)